Prismatomerideae is a tribe of flowering plants in the family Rubiaceae and contains 24 species in 3 genera. Its representatives are found in Indo-China and tropical Asia.

Genera 
Currently accepted names
 Gentingia J.T.Johanss. & K.M.Wong (1 sp)
 Prismatomeris Thwaites (15 sp)
 Rennellia Korth. (8 sp)

Synonyms
 Didymoecium Bremek. = Rennellia
 Tribrachya Korth. = Rennellia
 Zeuxanthe Ridl. = Prismatomeris

References 

Rubioideae tribes